Lienemann is a surname. Notable people with the surname include:

David Lienemann (born 1982/83, American photographer
Klaus Lienemann (born 1947), German footballer
Manfred Lienemann (born 1946), German footballer and manager
Marie-Noëlle Lienemann (born 1951), French politician
Timo Lienemann (born 1985), German racing driver